Oued Djemaais a town in Relizane Province, Algeria.

References 

Relizane Province
Communes of Relizane Province
Cities in Algeria